Santa Engracia del Jubera is a village in the province and autonomous community of La Rioja, Spain.

Demographics

Population centres
 Santa Engracia del Jubera
 Bucesta
 El Collado
 Jubera
 Reinares
 San Bartolomé
 San Martín
 Santa Cecilia
 Santa Marina

References

Populated places in La Rioja (Spain)